Twelve Responses to Tragedy, or the Yalta Memorial, is a memorial located in the Yalta Memorial Garden on Cromwell Road in South Kensington in west London. The memorial commemorates people displaced as a result of the Yalta Conference at the conclusion of the Second World War. Created by the British sculptor Angela Conner, the work consists of twelve bronze busts atop a stone base. The memorial was dedicated in 1986 to replace a previous memorial (also by Conner) from 1982 that had been repeatedly damaged by vandalism.

Location
The memorial is located in the Yalta Memorial Garden at the junction of Cromwell Gardens, Thurloe Place and Thurloe Square, adjacent to the Victoria & Albert Museum to the north. The garden and memorial are publicly accessible at all times.

History
Plans for a memorial were initiated after a letter was written to The Spectator in the 1970s signed by Richard West, Patrick Marnham and Auberon Waugh who proposed that a memorial be erected to the "... memory of the hundreds of thousands of innocent people who were forcibly repatriated by the Allies to the Soviet and Yugoslav authorities at the end of the Second World War, a crime that was carefully hushed up at the time and even concealed from Parliament for fear of the outcry that would have resulted". A later letter to The Times calling for a memorial was signed by politicians Bernard Braine, Jo Grimond, Donald J. Stewart, John Mackintosh, James Molyneaux, Gwynfor Evans, Nicholas Bethell, John Foster, Christopher Mayhew, and Harmar Nicholls, and writers Rebecca West, Hugh Trevor-Roper, Nicolas Cheetham, Nikolai Tolstoy and John Jolliffe.

Braine and Jolliffe later appealed for funds in a letter to The Times in 1978. The cost was of the memorial was estimated at £11,000 in their letter.

The memorial was approved by Prime Minister Margaret Thatcher in May 1980, over the objections of the Foreign Office who opposed the erection on land that belonged to the Crown Estate of a monument that implicitly criticised the past actions of the British government.

A memorial fountain with stone benches sculpted by Angela Conner was built and dedicated by the Bishop of London, Graham Leonard, on 6 March 1982. The creation of the memorial was opposed by both the government of the Soviet Union and the Foreign Office.

The memorial was repeatedly vandalised and was irreparably damaged after being cut in two by an electric stone-cutting saw in the autumn of 1982. An appeal for a second monument was launched and Conner sold lithographs for £50 each depicting scenes of brutality against refugees to help raise funds. Conner's second memorial for Yalta, Twelve Responses to Tragedy, was dedicated in the same place as the previous memorial on 2 August 1986 by the Bishop of Fulham, John Klyberg. Reviewing Conner's recent work in The Times in October 1986, critic John Russell Taylor wrote that the memorial "hardly rise[s] above the level of kitsch". In 2013 the memorial was described as being in a poor condition.

Description
The original memorial showed a sphere kept in perpetual motion by jets of water. The present memorial consists of a stone column upon a brick plinth, upon the column sits a bronze bust of 12 conjoined heads of men, women, and children.

On the south side of the memorial at ground level inscription on stone reads:

An inscription on a curved stone plinth on the east side of the memorial reads:

The inscription on the memorial was personally approved by Margaret Thatcher during her tenure as Prime Minister.
The memorial has been described as a war memorial as it was created in response to events that arose out of the conclusion of the Second World War.

Gallery

See also

 Operation Keelhaul
 Swedish extradition of Baltic soldiers
 Western betrayal
 Repatriation of Cossacks after World War II
 Bleiburg repatriations
 Soviet repressions against former prisoners of war
 XVth SS Cossack Cavalry Corps

References

1986 establishments in the United Kingdom
1986 in London
1986 sculptures
Bronze sculptures in the United Kingdom
Buildings and structures completed in 1986
Buildings and structures in the Royal Borough of Kensington and Chelsea
Communism in the United Kingdom
Outdoor sculptures in London
South Kensington
Soviet Union–United Kingdom relations
Vandalized works of art in the United Kingdom
World War II memorials in England
Removed monuments and memorials